Cronulla may refer to:
 Cronulla, a southern suburb of Sydney, New South Wales
 Cronulla-Sutherland Sharks, a rugby league team previously known as the Cronulla Sharks 
 Electoral district of Cronulla, a seat in the New South Wales Legislative Assembly
 Cronulla railway station
 Cronulla railway line
 Cronulla Beach
 Cronulla Surf Life Saving Club
 2005 Cronulla riots
 Cronulla sand dunes